Mircea Axente (born 9 December 1944) is a Romanian former football midfielder and referee. In the 1970–1971 European Cup, Axente was the one who gave the assist to Florian Dumitrescu who scored UTA's decisive goal that eliminated Feyenoord who were European champions at that time. After he ended his playing career he became a referee, arbitrating matches in Romania's top-league Divizia A and at international and European club level. A book about him was written by Radu Romănescu and Ionel Costin, called Mircea Axente, de pe maidanele Aradului în casa campioanei lumii (Mircea Axente,  from the slopes of Arad in the world champion's house).

Honours
UTA Arad
Divizia A: 1968–69, 1969–70
Cupa României runner-up: 1965–66

References

External links
Mircea Axente player profile at Labtof.ro
Mircea Axente referee profile at Labtof.ro

1944 births
Living people
Romanian footballers
Association football midfielders
Liga I players
Liga II players
FC UTA Arad players
Vagonul Arad players
Romanian football referees